Gregory Jack Biffle (born December 23, 1969) is an American semi-retired professional stock car racing driver. He last competed part-time in the NASCAR Cup Series, driving the No. 44 Chevrolet Camaro ZL1 for NY Racing Team and full-time in the Superstar Racing Experience, driving the No. 69 car.

After racing in the NASCAR Winter Heat Series in the mid-1990s, he was recommended to Jack Roush by former announcer Benny Parsons. With Roush Racing, he was the 1998 NASCAR Craftsman Truck Series Rookie of the Year. He won the 2000 Craftsman Truck championship. He reprised this progression in the NASCAR Busch Series, winning the 2001 Rookie of the Year, immediately followed by winning the 2002 championship. Biffle drove in the NASCAR Sprint Cup Series for Roush from 2003 until 2016, winning 19 races in the No. 16 Ford.

Biffle, who began his NASCAR career in 1995, is the first of only three drivers that have won a championship in both the Busch Series and the Craftsman Truck Series, and the sixth of only thirty-six drivers to win a race in each of NASCAR's three national series. Biffle returned to NASCAR in 2019 when he ran the 2019 SpeedyCash.com 400 for Kyle Busch Motorsports, which he won.

Racing career

Biffle was born and raised in Camas, Washington. He began his racing career driving on short tracks around the Pacific Northwest. He first gained attention as a driver when he raced in the nationally televised Winter Heat Series in the winter of 1995–1996. Biffle dominated the series championship that winter, leading former ESPN announcer and NASCAR champion, Benny Parsons, to recommend the driver to Jack Roush.

Biffle entered the first two races of the 1996 Winston West Series, finishing 30th at Tucson and 4th at Altamont. His debut in one of NASCAR's national divisions came later that year when he ran the final two Busch Series races of the season. Driving a Chevrolet for Dick Bown, he finished 23rd at Rockingham but lost an engine the following race at Homestead and finished 36th. In 1997, Biffle competed in the now-defunct NASCAR Northwest Series and won the Most Popular Driver Award.

Gander RV & Outdoors Truck Series
Roush Racing promoted Biffle to a full-time driver in the Craftsman Truck Series in 1998. Despite not winning a race that season, Biffle's four pole positions are the most by a Truck Series rookie to date and they helped him earn an 8th-place finish in the final standings and the Rookie of the Year Award. He followed it up with a stellar 1999 season in which he recorded nine wins, a single-season Truck Series record that still stands . He finished second in the final standings, just eight points behind champion Jack Sprague.

In 2000, Biffle won the Truck Series title with another five-win season, beating his Roush teammate Kurt Busch by 230 points. It was Biffle's first championship in one of NASCAR's three major series. It was announced that Biffle would move up to the Busch Series for 2001, however, he ran four more Truck races for Roush that season and won at Phoenix. Biffle made a Truck Series start in 2004 for another long-time Ford team, Circle Bar Racing, at Homestead.

On March 28, 2019, Biffle announced he would be testing with Kyle Busch Motorsports the next day at Texas Motor Speedway in the No. 51 truck. He was eventually tabbed to drive the truck for the SpeedyCash.com 400 at Texas. Biffle started sixth and won in his series return, leading 18 laps and holding off Matt Crafton while winning $50,000 in a promotion with Gander Outdoors; it was his first Truck victory since 2001.

On August 27, 2020, it was announced that Biffle would make another one-off start in the Truck Series, this time in the No. 24 for GMS Racing at Darlington. He would go on to finish 19th.

Nationwide Series
Biffle joined the Busch Series full-time in 2001 and won the Rookie of the Year Award with five wins a fourth-place finish in the final standings. The following season, he won another four races and earned 20 top-five finishes out of 34 races en route to his first Busch Series title and the second NASCAR national championship of his career.

He ran only part-time in 2003 as Roush moved him up to a full-time ride in the Winston Cup Series for that season, but he returned to contend for the Busch Series championship again in 2004. He placed third in the standings behind Martin Truex Jr. and Kyle Busch. From 2005 to 2009, Biffle raced part-time for Roush Fenway Racing in the Busch (now Xfinity Series) every year. He won twice in 2009, at Las Vegas and Phoenix, after going winless the previous two seasons. Biffle returned to the Nationwide Series in 2010, driving the No. 27 Ford for Baker Curb Racing.

Cup Series

Biffle began his Cup Series career in the 2002 season. He attempted to qualify in a Roush Ford for the 2002 Daytona 500 but failed to make the race. He would make his first Cup debut nine races later at California, a race in which he finished 13th. That was his best finish in seven races that year as he also drove four in a Chevrolet for Andy Petree Racing and two in a Dodge for Petty Enterprises.

Biffle began competing full-time in NASCAR's top division in 2003, with sponsorship from W. W. Grainger, who had previously sponsored him in the Busch and Truck Series. He earned his first win in the Pepsi 400 at Daytona that season and finished second to Jamie McMurray (who would later join him as a teammate at Roush) for Raybestos Rookie of the Year. Biffle placed 20th in the final points standings.

Biffle made an immediate impact in his sophomore season in 2004, earning the pole in the Daytona 500. However, Biffle was forced to start at the rear due to an engine change. Despite missing NASCAR's first-ever Chase for the NEXTEL Cup, Biffle won twice that season, at Michigan and Homestead en route to a 17th-place finish in the final points standings.

2005 was Biffle's breakout season. He won six races (at California Speedway, Texas, Darlington, Dover, and Michigan along with the season finale at Homestead), the most of any driver that year, and qualified for the Chase for the first time in his career, bringing home a second-place finish in the standings, 35 points behind champion Tony Stewart; Biffle tied with his teammate Carl Edwards in points but won the tie-breaker based on race wins.

Biffle regressed in 2006, missing the Chase for the Cup despite winning twice at Darlington Raceway and Homestead-Miami Speedway (both of which were tracks at which he had also won in the previous season). He finished 13th in the standings, third-best of the drivers not to qualify for the Chase. He also missed the Chase the following year, in a season marred by the No. 16 team's new primary sponsor Ameriquest Mortgage suffering financial difficulty and having to sell off a number of its race sponsorships. Biffle won only one race in 2007, at Kansas Speedway. As Biffle was doing burnouts on the track, third place Jimmie Johnson and second place Clint Bowyer accused Biffle of not maintaining speed under a final lap caution but this was denied by NASCAR who said Biffle had pace car speed.

In 2007, Biffle finished 14th in the standings, second-best of the non-Chase drivers as the Chase expanded to a 12-driver format that year. He Won At Kansas During The Chase In 2007

In June 2008, Biffle signed a year-long contract extension with Roush Fenway Racing. Despite going winless during the 26-race regular season, Biffle made for the Chase for the Sprint Cup that year and won the first two Chase races, at New Hampshire and Dover. In doing so, he became the first driver to win the first two Chase races in a season.

Biffle qualified for the Chase for the second year in a row in 2009 but for the first time since 2002 (when he ran a limited schedule), failed to record a win. During a test in January 2009 at Texas World Speedway, Biffle managed to reach  in a test for Roush Fenway Racing as part of evading NASCAR's testing ban. This became the fastest time ever achieved on this track by any competitor (amateur or professional).

In 2010, Biffle qualified for the third year in a row for the Chase despite spotty performance in the regular season. He won twice at Pocono and Kansas.
In 2011, Biffle's season improved, thanks in part to the implementation of Ford's new FR9 engine. However, crew chief Greg Erwin was replaced after Kentucky by Matt Puccia. The addition of Puccia helped Biffle's performance late in the season, despite the team missing the Chase and finishing 16th in points. Biffle missed the Chase in 2011 for the first time since 2007.

In 2012, Biffle and Puccia remained at RFR and gained the points lead after Las Vegas after three consecutive third-place finishes. At the 2012 Daytona 500, Biffle found himself second coming to the white flag for the third time in two years and again finished third. Eerily, the third place at Vegas came in Biffle's 333rd Cup start. Biffle's first win of the 2012 season came at Texas Motor Speedway in the Samsung Mobile 500 after passing Jimmie Johnson with 30 laps left in the race. Biffle won at Michigan holding off Brad Keselowski after Jimmie Johnson blew an engine.

Biffle started off 2013 by being in the same position for the third time in four years; in second place coming to the white flag in the 2013 Daytona 500 but this time ended up sixth. In the 2013 Quicken Loans 400 at Michigan, Biffle won his fourth race at the track and the 1,000th victory for Ford.

At the 2014 Coca-Cola 600, Biffle surpassed Clint Bowyer's record for most consecutive races without failing to finish with 84, tying Herman Beam's record, dating back to the 2011 Ford 400. The following week at the FedEx 400, he broke Beam's record by finishing the race 108 laps down in 38th. Later in the season, he finished with a DNF for the first time in 89 races after a wreck in the Coke Zero 400, finishing 29th.

Biffle began the pre-season with an announcement that he would stay at Roush Fenway Racing to help the team with a new sponsor Ortho. Biffle began 2015 with a 10th-place finish in the Daytona 500. Unfortunately, that was as good as it could get for Biffle as he faded outside the top twenty in points. He struggled mightily before picking up a second-place finish in the 2015 Coca-Cola 600, after starting fourth. He went on to pick up a fifth-place finish at Pocono in the 2015 Windows 10 400 and a fourth-place at New Hampshire in the 2015 Sylvania 300, finishing twentieth in points.

Ortho announced they would depart Roush following the 2015 season, leaving Biffle without a primary sponsor for the 2016 season. KFC then announced they would sponsor Biffle throughout speedweeks and in the Daytona 500. He earned his first pole position in four seasons during qualifying for the Coke Zero 400 at Daytona and went on to finish eighth in the race.

After finishing 23rd in points in 2016, Biffle and Roush Fenway mutually parted ways, making Biffle a free agent for the upcoming 2017 season. He did not sign on with a ride for the 2017 season.

Biffle returned to the series in 2022, driving the No. 44 for NY Racing Team at the Daytona 500 and the remainder of the teams races as well.

Stadium Super Trucks

On August 21, 2018, Biffle tested a Stadium Super Truck that was driven by fellow ex-NASCAR driver Casey Mears. A day later, he announced he would make his series debut at Road America. He finished seventh and second in the weekend's two races, though he did not receive points in the standings as he drove the No. 57 truck in place of Bill Hynes, who received the points earned by Biffle under series rules.

Biffle returned to SST for the 2019 season, sharing a Continental AG-sponsored truck with Sheldon Creed and Ryan Beat. He ran his first races of the year in late July at Mid-Ohio Sports Car Course. In the weekend's first round, he battled with Gavin Harlien for the lead until Harlien began suffering mechanical trouble; on the final restart, Cole Potts passed Biffle to take the race win. The second round saw Biffle pit under caution for damage, but was able to finish fourth. In October, he ran his first SST race in Australia at Surfers Paradise Street Circuit. In practice, he was the fastest in the ten-driver field but did not set a qualifying time after flipping his truck when he hit a tire barrier. He ran in second for much of the first race before falling to fourth after an erratic landing; the second race saw a late spin drop him to eighth.

After not racing in 2020, Biffle rejoined the series at the 2021 Mid-Ohio NASCAR weekend. He finished second in Race 2.

Superstar Racing Experience
In 2021, it was announced that Biffle would pilot the No. 69 car in select 2021 Camping World SRX Series races. He started his season off at the inaugural SRX race at Stafford Motor Speedway, winning the first heat but getting caught up in a wreck in the second heat. For the main event, he switched to a backup car and drove to second by the end of the race, behind only Doug Coby.

Other racing
In 2003, Biffle competed in the International Race of Champions. He recorded a best finish of third at Talladega and finished seventh in points.

Biffle, along with Roush teammates Kurt Busch and Matt Kenseth, raced at the 2005 24 Hours of Daytona for Multimatic Motorsports. The team lost a halfshaft during the race and finished 27th.

In 2018, Biffle started the Sand Outlaw Series for racing UTVs. The series has since grown into a popular multi-class drag racing championship featuring hill climbs and flat track events. He competes out of his own UTV shop, Pace Offroad.

Personal life

Greg is the son of Garland Jack Biffle II (1941–2016) and Sally Frye. He has a brother, Jeffrey. He is of German and English descent as his ancestor, Johannes Büffel (1728–1804) came from Contwig in Western Germany and settled in North Carolina.

Biffle married Nicole (née Lunders) on October 17, 2007. Their daughter, Emma Elizabeth, was born on July 6, 2011. At birth, she weighed 7 lbs and 6 oz. The couple separated in early 2015 and have been divorced since early 2016.

Biffle's second child, Ryder Jack, was born on September 9, 2020. Ryder Jack is the first child between Biffle and his fiancée,  Cristina Grosseu.

Biffle is a fan of fishing and enjoys deep sea fishing in Mexico, where he keeps a factory-sponsored Luhrs fishing boat. He formerly owned a pub in his hometown of Vancouver called "Biffle's Pub and Grill" located at 11500 NE 76th St. In 2010 Biffle announced that he had become part-owner of Willamette Speedway in Lebanon, Oregon along with Sunset Speedway in Banks, Oregon. He is also a private pilot and owns a Cessna 210, along with a Dassault Falcon 50 with the tail number N116GB, a Dassault Falcon 10 with the tail number N316GB, and a Bell 206 with tail number N216GB. Biffle owns a 2007 Ford GT and a 2007 Shelby Mustang GT500. The Shelby Mustang engine was rebuilt in 2013 and has 983 horsepower and 799 lb-ft of torque.

A civil suit for Invasion of privacy against Biffle was filed by his ex-wife and mother-in-law alleging Biffle placed secret cameras in his bedroom and bathroom recording nude images of them.    The jury awarded Biffle's ex-wife $1 in damages and found him responsible for these cameras and invasion of privacy.  

On February 17, 2017, Biffle announced that instead of racing full-time in 2017, he would join NBC Sports' NASCAR America as an analyst beginning March 1, 2017.

Motorsports career results

NASCAR
(key) (Bold – Pole position awarded by qualifying time. Italics – Pole position earned by points standings or practice time. * – Most laps led.)

Cup Series

 – Biffle did not receive points for the 2022 Daytona 500.

Daytona 500

Nationwide Series

Gander RV & Outdoors Truck Series

 Season still in progress

International Race of Champions
(key) (Bold – Pole position. * – Most laps led.)

24 Hours of Daytona
(key)

Stadium Super Trucks
(key) (Bold – Pole position. Italics – Fastest qualifier. * – Most laps led.)

Superstar Racing Experience
(key) * – Most laps led. 1 – Heat 1 winner. 2 – Heat 2 winner.

 Season still in progress

See also
 List of all-time NASCAR Cup Series winners
 List of animal rights advocates
 List of Daytona 500 pole position winners
 List of NASCAR Camping World Truck Series champions
 List of NASCAR Nationwide Series champions
 List of NASCAR Sprint All-Star Race drivers
 List of people from Washington (state)

References

External links
 
 
 Greg Biffle at Roush Fenway Racing
 The Greg Biffle Foundation

Living people
1969 births
Sportspeople from Vancouver, Washington
Racing drivers from Washington (state)
24 Hours of Daytona drivers
NASCAR drivers
NASCAR Xfinity Series champions
NASCAR Truck Series champions
International Race of Champions drivers
Stadium Super Trucks drivers
3M people
People from Camas, Washington
Motorsport announcers
RFK Racing drivers
Multimatic Motorsports drivers
Kyle Busch Motorsports drivers